Halocercus is a genus of nematodes belonging to the family Pseudaliidae.

The species of this genus are found in Europe and Northern America.

Species:

Halocercus brasiliensis 
Halocercus cryptocephalus 
Halocercus dalli 
Halocercus delphini 
Halocercus hyperoodoni 
Halocercus invaginatus 
Halocercus kirbyi 
Halocercus kleinenbergi 
Halocercus lagenorhynchi 
Halocercus monoceris 
Halocercus pingi 
Halocercus sunameri 
Halocercus taurica

References

Nematodes